Opostega orestias is a moth of the family Opostegidae. It was described by Edward Meyrick in 1880. It is known from Queensland, Australia.

References

Opostegidae
Moths described in 1880